The individual combined driving at the 2014 World Equestrian Games in Normandy was held at La Prairie Race Course in Caen from 4 to 7 September.

Australia's Boyd Exell won gold medal, the country's only medal at the games. Chester Weber from the United States won silver while the bronze went to Theo Timmerman representing the Netherlands.

Competition format

The team and individual driving competitions used the same scores. Driving consisted of dressage, marathon and obstacle-cone stages. Penalties from all of the stages were added up to determine the final results.

Schedule

All times are Central European Summer Time (UTC+2)

Results

Standings after Dressage

Standings after Marathon

Final Results

References

2014 in equestrian